The European Alliance (EA) is a political group in the European Committee of the Regions composed of a mix of regionalist parties and independent members. It was established in 1996, with strong influence of the European Free Alliance, and has since then existed in several incarnations.

Currently, the group gathers 29 local and regional politicians from the following Member States: Belgium, France, Ireland, Lithuania, Netherlands, Poland, Romania, Slovakia, and Spain.

History

Since its foundation in 1996 until 2004, the European Alliance group consisted of the European Free Alliance's member parties aligned with a group of independents and the then-governing party of the Republic of Ireland, Fianna Fáil, thus serving as a relatively loose grouping of regionalist and non-regionalist members of the European Committee of the Regions. The group's main founding principles included:

 Support for an open Europe of regions and nations
 Support for highest possible standards for environmental protection, workers' health, consumer protection, veterinary rules, social welfare and democratic principles

In 2004 the group was reconstituted as Union for Europe of the Nations – European Alliance (UEN–EA), uniting a wide range of political options, from traditionally centrist parties to more national-conservative ones. At the time, the group was partly affiliated with the European Parliament's Union for Europe of the Nations.

In 2009, the group restored its original name and has since returned to its regionalist roots.

Present

​​​​​​​​​​​​​​​​​​EA group currently gathers 29 m​embers and alternates from Catalonia, Corsica, Flanders, Friesland, Hungary, Ireland, Lithuania, Navarra, Poland, Romania and Slovakia.

Political priorities

Apart from its regionalist affiliations, the group gathers a significant number of independent members active in the development of Europe's disadvantaged regions, particularly rural, mountainous and island areas. In addition, a strong focus is put on the promotion of green economy and the protection of Europe's cultural and linguistic diversity, especially regional identities.

Some of the group's main priorities include:

 Cohesive Union based on common responsibilities and solidarity
 Increased EU support for entrepreneurship, SMEs and social enterprises at a local and regional level 
 Balanced development across all of EU's regions, particularly focused on narrowing the gaps between rich and poorer regions and ensuring an urban-rural balance.
 Investment in green growth and technologies aimed at enhancing a  low carbon economy, improving energy efficiency and protecting the environment and natural resources
 Universal access to education
 Promotion of Europe's cultural and linguistic diversity, particularly of lesser used and regional languages
 Support for the principle of self-determination, including support for the EU's "internal enlargement", provided that it is achieved through a peaceful and democratic process
 Better European governance through a  considerable improvement in the functioning,  simplicity and transparency of the EU.

Presidents

The current president of the group is Mr Karl Vanlouwe, Member of the Flemish Parliament.

Previous presidents include:

References

External links
Official website
EA Group's political priorities for 2020-2025
EA Group's mission statement
European Committee of the Regions
European Free Alliance

Political organizations based in Europe
European Committee of the Regions party groups